The Real Estate Developers Association of Hong Kong (REDA) is a business organization representing the property development industry in Hong Kong. It was established in 1965 under the chairmanship of Henry Fok. The association's members included the 17 major developers in Hong Kong.

History 
In November 2020, REDA issued a statement supporting the decision to disqualify 4 pro-democracy lawmakers from the Legislative Council, stating that "The decision will help safeguard national sovereignty and implement 'one country, two systems'."

In January 2023, Stewart Leung Chi-kin from REDA said that developers would "make a lot of noise" if the government decided to repurpose a community isolation facility into public housing, and said "Repurposing that facility will ruin the entire Kai Tak area." On a separate plot of land also in Kai Tak, Leung said that developers were worried about traffic concerns if public housing were built there.

In February 2023, after the government stipulated that land leases cannot violate the national security law, Leung said that "The latest practice will not have an impact on a developer's desire to tender for land or not. It will not scare away foreigners who are true investors, but only those that hope to disturb and obstruct the city's development with political motives."

In February 2023, Leung also called for the government to end of stamp duties, saying "the Earth will not stop spinning" if stamp duties are eliminated.

Executive Committee membership

 
 Cheung Kong (Holdings)
 Chinachem Investment
 Hang Lung Properties 
 Henderson Land Development
 Hongkong Land Property
 Hopewell Holdings
 Hutchison Properties
 Hysan Development
 The Great Eagle
 Lai Sun Development
 New World Development
 Shun Tak Holdings
 Sino Land
 Sun Hung Kai Properties
 Swire Properties
 Wheelock Properties

See also
 Land and the Ruling Class in Hong Kong, a book that about the "property-cum-utility/public services conglomerates" of the city

References

Chambers of commerce in Hong Kong
1965 establishments in Hong Kong
Land developers of Hong Kong